Amanda Kelly is a Scottish female kickboxer and mixed martial artist, based in London. She has competed professionally since 2005 and is currently in the Cage Warriors Bantamweight division. Trained in Muay Thai for 5 years due to her upright stance compared to other in her training group.

Fight career

Amanda Kelly began competing in the IFMA European Championships 2009 in Latvia and the IFMA World Championships 2009 in Thailand gaining a Silver and Bronze medals. Amanda then made the decision to focus and become a kickboxer the sport and gave up her career in Architecture. This decision lead to her achieving the WMC (MAD) World Title (2010) and the ISKA World Title (2011). Amanda Kelly has defeated opponents such as Joanna Jędrzejczyk, Chantal Ughi, Claire Haigh, Rachida Hilali.

Amanda Kelly is originally from a small village outside of Inverness called Drumnadrochit. She studied and worked in Scotland but did not have the time to train and compete which led her to moving to London. The East London KO Muay Thai gym was the first gym she joined after moving.

Amanda Kelly worked in the field of architecture when she first moved to London. After this, she began to study to become a personal trainer.

Titles
2011 – ISKA World Champion
2010 – WMC (MAD) World Champion
2009 – IFMA World Championships, Thailand (Bronze)
2009 – IFMA European Championships, Latvia (Silver)

Kickboxing record

|- style="background:#cfc;"
|
| style="text-align:center;"|Win
| Fatima Adib
|Enfusion Live
| London, England
| style="text-align:center;"|Decision
|align=center|
|align=center|
| style="text-align:center;"|30–1–1
|-
|- style="background:#cfc;"
|
| style="text-align:center;"|Win
| Julie Kitchen
|In Honor of the King, Playa Vista
| Los Angeles, United States
| style="text-align:center;"|Split Decision
|align=center|
|align=center|
| style="text-align:center;"|29–1–1
|-
! style=background:white colspan=9 |
|-
|- style="background:#cfc;"
|
| style="text-align:center;"|Win
| Chantal Ughi
|
| London, England
| style="text-align:center;"|TKO (Liver Kick)
|align=center|
|align=center|
| style="text-align:center;"|28–1–1
|-
|- style="background:#cfc;"
|
| style="text-align:center;"|Win
| Joanna Jędrzejczyk
|Lady Killers 4
| Manchester, England
| style="text-align:center;"|Unanimous Decision
|align=center|5
|align=center|3:00
| style="text-align:center;"|27–1–1
|-
|- style="background:#c5d2ea;"
|
| style="text-align:center;"|Draw
| Claire Haigh
|Muay Thai Addicts III
| 
| style="text-align:center;"|Unanimous Decision
|align=center|3
|align=center|3:00
| style="text-align:center;"|26–1–1
|-
| colspan=9 | Legend:

Mixed martial arts record

|Loss
|align=center|1–3
|L.J. Adams
|Submission (Rear-Naked Choke)
|CWFC 72 – Cage Warriors Fighting Championship 72
|
|align=center|3
|align=center|3:33
|Newport, Wales
|
|-
|Loss
|align=center|1–2
|Kerry Hughes
|TKO (Punches)
|CWFC 69 – Super Saturday
|
|align=center|2
|align=center|4:56
|London, England
|
|-
|Loss
|align=center|1–1
|Laura Howarth
|Decision (Unanimous)
|CWFC 64 – Cage Warriors Fighting Championship 64
|
|align=center|3
|align=center|5:00
|London, England
|
|-
|Win
|align=center|1–0
|Hannah Stephens
|KO (Knee)
|CWFC 60 – Cage Warriors Fighting Championship 60
|
|align=center|1
|align=center|3:40
|London, England
|

See also
 List of female kickboxers
 List of female mixed martial artists

References

External links
 Amanda Kelly at Awakening Fighters

1982 births
Sportspeople from London
Scottish female kickboxers
Living people
Scottish female mixed martial artists
Bantamweight mixed martial artists
Mixed martial artists utilizing boxing
Mixed martial artists utilizing Muay Thai
Flyweight kickboxers
Female Muay Thai practitioners
Scottish Muay Thai practitioners